Riley O'Neill (born September 9, 1985) is a Canadian soccer coach and former player who serves as an assistant coach for Pacific FC.

Club career
On January 18, 2007 O'Neill was drafted by Colorado Rapids in the third round (36th overall) of the 2007 MLS Supplemental Draft. His rights were traded to Toronto FC on April 19, 2007. However, he never signed with Toronto, opting to try his luck abroad.

O'Neill signed with German club SV Wilhelmshaven who played in the Regionalliga Nord in 2007 through 2008, before moving to Eintracht Braunschweig. He struggled for playing time with Braunschweig, spending most his time with their second team. O'Neill moved back to SV Wilhelmshaven in 2009.

O'Neill moved again in 2011, this to MYPA who played in the Finnish Veikkausliiga. He managed twelve goals over two seasons with the club, but he became a free agent at the end of their 2012 season.

The Victoria Highlanders announced the signing of Riley O'Neill as one of their over-age players for the 2013 May–July summer USL PDL season. He joined 2014 to new founded Vancouver Metro Soccer League club CCBRT United FC, who played with former pro Taj Sangara.

Coaching career
O'Neill earned his Canada Soccer Coaching B License in 2017. He began coaching with Vic West FC, before signing as an assistant coach with Canadian Premier League side Pacific FC on January 14, 2020.

References

External links

1985 births
Living people
People from Campbell River, British Columbia
Canadian people of Irish descent
Canadian soccer players
Soccer players from Vancouver
Association football forwards
Canada men's youth international soccer players
Kentucky Wildcats men's soccer players
Colorado Rapids draft picks
SV Wilhelmshaven players
Eintracht Braunschweig players
Eintracht Braunschweig II players
Myllykosken Pallo −47 players
Victoria Highlanders players
3. Liga players
USL League Two players
Veikkausliiga players
Pacific FC non-playing staff
Canadian expatriate soccer players
Expatriate soccer players in the United States
Canadian expatriate sportspeople in the United States
Expatriate footballers in Germany
Canadian expatriate sportspeople in Germany
Expatriate footballers in Finland
Canadian expatriate sportspeople in Finland